Sulphur Springs is an unincorporated community in DeKalb County, in the U.S. state of Alabama.

History
The community was founded as a stop on the Alabama Great Southern Railroad. It was once home to the Alabama White Sulphur Springs Hotel, an 80-room hotel, which also included six cottages, built by Col. A. B. Hanna in 1871. The hotel remained in operation until 1929, when it and the surrounding property were donated to the YWCA of Chattanooga. It was operated as Camp Elizabeth Lupton by the YWCA until 1953.

The community was named for the springs of sulphur water near the town site.

A post office called Sulphur Springs was established in 1885, and remained in operation until 1918. The post office was moved across the border to Sulphur Springs, Georgia, with mail being brought over from the train depot in Georgia.

References

Unincorporated communities in DeKalb County, Alabama
Unincorporated communities in Alabama